Annette Hakonsen (born 17 October 1962) is a Danish former female darts player.

Hakonsen was picked 20 times for the national team – which is a record for senior players. Between 1990 and 2007, she won a record high 22 Danish Championships, 7 of them in singles. In 1998, she became the first female Danish dart player to win the Nordic Championship in singles, beating Ann-Louise Peters.

References

Living people
Danish darts players
1976 births